Diocese of California may refer to the following US ecclesiastical jurisdictions covering California :

 Episcopal Diocese of California
 Roman Catholic Diocese of California, also called the Diocese of Both Californias, which became the Roman Catholic Diocese of Monterey in California
Roman Catholic Titular Bishopric of California, a titular see based on the name of the defunct diocese